Richard Pearson Creagh-Osborne (5 April 1928 – 20 August 1980) was a British sailor. He competed in the Finn event at the 1956 Summer Olympics.

References

External links
 
 

1928 births
1980 deaths
British male sailors (sport)
Olympic sailors of Great Britain
Sailors at the 1956 Summer Olympics – Finn
People from Stowmarket